The 39th General Assembly of Prince Edward Island was in session from April 6, 1920, to June 23, 1923. The Liberal Party led by John Howatt Bell formed the government.

C. Gavin Duffy was elected speaker.

There were four sessions of the 39th General Assembly:

Members

Kings

Prince

Queens

Notes:

References
  Election results for the Prince Edward Island Legislative Assembly, 1919-07-24
 O'Handley, Kathryn Canadian Parliamentary Guide, 1994 

Terms of the General Assembly of Prince Edward Island
1920 establishments in Prince Edward Island
1923 disestablishments in Prince Edward Island